Muhammad Zarif Irfan bin Hashimuddin (born 21 February 1995) is a Malaysian footballer who is now playing for Sri Pahang in Malaysia Super League as a goalkeeper.

Club career

AirAsia
Zarif was a baggage handler at a low-cost airline, AirAsia and represented the company in the third tier Malaysia FAM League in 2015.

Selangor
After his contract with AirAsia expired, Zarif signed with Malaysia Super League side Selangor on December 2015. Zarif has not made any appearances for Selangor in 2016 season. On 21 January 2017, he made his league debut for Selangor in a 2–0 win over Penang in MP Selayang Stadium.

PKNS
On December 2017, Zarif signed a contract with Malaysia Super League club PKNS FC. He made his debut for the club on 14 July 2018 in a 4–0 win over Terengganu.

Career statistics

Club

References

External links

Malaysian footballers
Selangor FA players
PKNS F.C. players
Sri Pahang FC players
People from Johor
1995 births
Living people
Malaysia Super League players
Malaysian people of Malay descent
Association football goalkeepers